Jan Gomola (5 August 1941 – 24 February 2022) was a Polish footballer who played as a goalkeeper. He made seven appearances for the Poland national team from 1966 to 1971. Gomola died on 24 February 2022, at the age of 80. Besides Poland, he played in Mexico.

Career

Gomola started his career with Górnik Zabrze.

References

External links
 

1941 births
2022 deaths
People from Ustroń
Sportspeople from Silesian Voivodeship
Polish footballers
Association football goalkeepers
Poland international footballers
Górnik Zabrze players
Atlético Español footballers
Club Atlético Zacatepec players
Polish expatriate footballers
Polish expatriate sportspeople in Mexico
Expatriate footballers in Mexico